Through the Years / A Traves de los Años is a collection of Selena's greatest hits. It was released on April 3, 2007. It comes as a CD/DVD set that includes Selena's songs, unreleased performances, and also an unreleased track titled "Feelings" recorded when she was 7 years old. The album peaked at number 28 on the Latin Album Chart and was certified Gold.

Track listing
 Feelings (Unreleased)
 Como Te Quiero Yo A Ti
 Tu Solamente Tu
 Tu No Sabes
 Que
 Sukiyaki
 Amame, Quiereme
 Yo Te Amo
 Ya Ves
 Yo Te Sigo Queriendo
 Amame
 No Debes Jugar
 La Llamada
 Fotos Y Recuerdos
 Ya No
 Dreaming of You
 Puede Ser

DVD Listing
Noche de Carnaval 1995
 No Me Queda Más 
 Si Una Vez

"La Movida" TV show with Veronica Castro
 No Debes Jugar
 Baila Esta Cumbia

"En Vivo con Ricardo Rocha" TV Show
 Amor Prohibido / Bidi Bidi Bom Bom
 Como La Flor / Baila Esta Cumbia
 La Carcacha

Acapulco Fest 1994
 La Llamada
 Como La Flor

Charts

Weekly charts

References
. 

2007 greatest hits albums
Compilation albums published posthumously
Selena compilation albums
Albums recorded at Q-Productions